On & On is an album by Jennifer Holliday. The album was released in 1994 on Intersound Records.

Synopsis
On & On is the fifth album by Holliday and contains the notable singles "Let Jesus Love You", "To Teach Me", and "On and On (Stronger)".

Track listing 
 "Let Jesus Love You"
 "I'll Praise His Name"
 "To Teach Me"
 "On and On (Stronger)"
 "In Spite of It All"
 "Show Some Signs"
 "Healing Hands"
 "It Is Well With My Soul"
 "Hallelujah, Amen"

References

External links

Jennifer Holliday albums
1994 albums